Frank Tang (born Dai Jung Tong) was a Chinese-American character actor, filmmaker, community leader, and restaurateur who was best-known for directing the 1936 Cantonese-language film Sum Hun.

Biography 
Frank was born in San Francisco into a big Chinese-American family. His parents, Yee Tong and Wong Shee, were immigrants. His brother Kam Tong would also become an actor.

He began his career in Hollywood in the late 1920s, and he got a rare chance to work as a director in 1936, when he teamed up with Bruce Wong and Esther Eng to make the Cantonese-language American film Sum Hun. He'd appear in over a dozen films afterward in smaller roles, in addition to serving as a technical advisor.

Later in life, he owned and operated a restaurant called Tang's in Los Angeles's Chinatown neighborhood. He died in 1968 at the age of 62 after an illness, and was survived by his wife, Birdie, and several siblings.

Selected filmography 
As director:

 Sum Hun (1936)

As actor:

The Hunters (1958)
The Lineup (1958)
The Seventh Sin (1957)
Soldier of Fortune (1955)
God Is My Co-Pilot (1945)
Objective, Burma! (1945)
Dragon Seed (1944)
The Purple Heart (1944)
Destination Tokyo (1943)
The Man from Down Under (1943)
Salute to the Marines (1943)
We've Never Been Licked (1943)
West of Shanghai (1937)
The Leathernecks Have Landed (1936)
The Great Divide (1929)

References

External links

American film directors
American male film actors
American male actors of Chinese descent
20th-century American male actors
Male actors from San Francisco
American film directors of Chinese descent
1905 births
1968 deaths